The 2009 Thailand National Games or Trang Games were held in Trang Province, Thailand, in September 2009.

Sports 

 Air sports
 Aquatics
Swimming
 Athletics
 Badminton
 Basketball
 Billiards and snooker
 Bodybuilding
 Boxing
 Cycling
 Track
 Road
 Mountain biking)
 Dancesport
 Fencing
 Football
 Go
 Golf
 Gymnastics
 Artistic
 Rhythmic
 Handball
 Judo
 Kabaddi
 Karatedo
 Muay Thai
 Pencak silat
 Pétanque
 Rowing
 Rugby football
 Shooting
 Sepak takraw
 Taekwondo
 Table tennis
 Tennis
 Volleyball
 Indoor
 Beach
 Weightlifting
 Wrestling
 Wushu

Top ten medals

National Games
Thailand National Games
National Games
Thailand National Games
National Games